The Bryologist is a peer reviewed scientific journal specializing in bryology.  It is published quarterly by the American Bryological and Lichenological Society (ABLS). It began as a department of The Fern Bulletin devoted to the study of North American mosses. Its first editor was Dr. Abel Joel Grout, who intended the bulletin to be "enabling any one at all interested in mosses to get some knowledge of these plants without excessive labor or expense ... the editor will also try to identify for subscribers difficult specimens accompanied by notes and return postage."

Subsequent editors have included James D. Lawrey (from 2012).

References

External links 
 The Bryologist at Internet Archive

Botany journals
Publications established in 1898
Quarterly journals
English-language journals
Bryology